AMC Love Radio is a radio station based in Tirana, the capital of Albania. The station broadcasts mostly pop ballads.

Radio stations in Albania
Mass media in Tirana